AT-43 is a science fiction tabletop wargame using 1:56th scale miniature figures and terrain developed and published by the French company Rackham from 2006 to 2008 and then Rackham-Entertainment from 2009 to 2010.
The game is classified as a platoon/company level game similar to Warhammer 40,000.

Released in December 2006, the game features plastic miniatures of mechs, vehicles and infantry units with corresponding cards showing the stats and gameplay options for each unit type. The game features alternate activation of units (similar to Chess) using the sequenced card mechanic. It also features command resource management (Leadership Points or LPs) to enable special unit actions called 'Combat Drills'.

Unlike many other miniature figure wargames, all of the miniatures are supplied pre-assembled, and painted. The game also provides a few pieces of 3-dimensional scenery, and 2-dimensional game mats to allow player to decide between mission-based objectives, or skirmish-based combat.

AT-43 is now a dead game with no further releases expected.

Universe 

In AT-43 [After Trauma: Year 43], humanity is at war with the technologically advanced Therians, a presumably robotic species bent on subjugating and transforming all planets for their ultimate purpose: the crafting of a "better", more organized universe under their rule, which they refer to as their "therian heaven". Humanity is seen by them as nothing more than pathetic, primitive animals.
The center of mankind is the planet Ava, which came under attack by the Therians. The United Nations of Ava managed to push back the invaders, but bitter fighting left the planet in ruins. This pivotal event is referred to as the Trauma.
43 years later, the human forces launched a counterattack under the codename "Operation Damocles" on one of the Therian's factory Planets, the starting point for the AT-43 miniatures game.

Although the UNA and RedBlok will often be identified as the "human" race, this is not the truth. By reading the Therian back-story in their Army book, you will find that it is actually the Therians who are the Human Race. The Therians hail from the Solar System SOL, which is located towards the tip of a spiral arm in the Milky Way Galaxy, and originate from the Third planet ('Terra') from the Sun. The Therians home planet was reconstructed by the Therians into a dyson sphere covering the sun long ago. Having become virtually immortal by re-engineering their own bodies, the Therians have been engineering the universe itself to prevent it from collapsing into a Big Crunch, a trillion years in the future, thereby insuring their eternal longevity. The Therians had predicted that without their intervention, the end of the Universe is inevitable, and that life will cease to exist in the future. Because of their all-encompassing view of existence, they see the only way to maintain existence is to destroy all known forms of planets and life and transform them into their type of travelling homeworld. To other races who do not share their same point of view, the Therians idea seems like the destruction of life itself, when ironically it is actually the permanent preservation of life. Most races will resist the Therians because they will fail to see their end-goal, and will put up resistance. Even though there are Races like the UNA who are powerful enough to temporarily disrupt the plans of the Therians, there are none who can hold them off for good. In the end, the Therians will either have their way or life will cease to exist when the Universe comes to an eventual halt.

Besides the external threat of the Therians, humanity is still fighting against each other: The Red Blok, a revolutionary faction with communist ideals, is at odds with the United Nations of Ava. The Red Blok started as an uprising on Ava's manufacturing planet Hades, and manifested itself into a political movement. At first the political opposition was crushed by the armed forces from Ava, but as the Avans started to think that the threat was subsided, the Red Blok managed to convince the planetary troops that their ideals were a better way of life.  The Defense force later joined forces with the struggling workers that they were assigned to subdue, and after a violent rebellion they created their own formal government. After the formation of the Red Blok, Ava lost its main production facilities, and the political movement spread throughout the planets under Avan control. The Red Blok is now a major threat to the Avan ways of life. Even though the Red Blok and the U.N.A. are allied in their efforts against the Therian threat, they are by no means on friendly terms. The bitter taste left between the two sides has led to disastrous un-cooperation, and communication failures. There is still a deep underlying distrust between the two sides, and as time goes on these feelings only burn deeper and deeper.

An alien race with as yet unknown motives are the Karmans, highly evolved, sentient apes from the planet Karma. The Karmans originally allied with the Therians when they first attacked Ava. The Karmans, like most races in the galaxy, owe their technological achievements to the ancient knowledge passed down through Therian relics left behind on their planet. Now that they see the massing army of the Therians, and that no one can escape their threat, the Karmans return to Ava to fight with Humanity to take on the omnivorous threat of the Therians. The Karmans do not want the balance of the universe destroyed, and though they have no allegiance to the humans, they see it fit to keep them around for the benefit of the galaxy. Not much is known about them yet, but concept art and a preview miniature show that they are a highly evolved Ape-like species that uses their technology to amplify their strength.

Millennia ago, the COGs started their evolution into the society they are now. Master of genetic manipulation, their worlds are led by 4 "families" based on the sequencing of DNA: A-Volution, T-Regulators, C-Naps, G-Nocrats. After a period of isolation where the Cogs ignored the rest of the universe unless they were trading with them, they resume their ancestral war with the Therians.

ONI Corporation, acronym of Okamura Non-aligned Industries, is a Corporation of mercenaries without political agenda other than becoming richer and more powerful by feeding on the war between nations and planetary systems. Their ability to trade information and services with everyone allows them to equip their soldiers with the best alien technology and to raise them from their demise thanks to their Zombie-weapons. If you have the coin, they will bring the heat.

Inspirations 

Main inspirations for AT-43 were typical science-fiction tropes from the 1950s and 1960s, but updated with a modern slant. The Cold War and the escalating conflicts from that period are also themes in the game. Stylistically, the game tries not to depict a dystopian future, but a future where propaganda from each side paints everything in bright colours.

Metaphorically speaking it is fairly easy to separate the U.N.A and the Red Blok. The Red Blok draws its visions directly from the formation of the Communist Party, and the background of their formation seems to draw historically from the struggles that brought about the Bolshevik Revolution. The overthrowing of the government by its people sends a strong message about authoritarian rule and exploitation, leaving a lesson to be learned, while the motivation behind the political changes paints a beautiful vision of an egalitarian society.

The inspiration for the U.N.A. is almost an exact doppelganger to the formation of the United Nations after World War II, and shares many similarities to it. Their goal is to provide a peaceful existence for humanity, but in their struggle for control they have managed to forget about the interests of the people that they rule and their goal of a Democratic Society. This type of power struggle appears to be a resemblance of the United States struggle to maintain a uniform system of government throughout the world, and the ups and downs of their efforts.

Forces

The U.N.A. 
The U.N.A or United Nations of Ava, is an interplanetary federation born from the human home planet of Ava. Originally established as the colonial empire of a united Avan government, the UNA in its most recent form was spawned after the Revolution on Hades that formed its ideological enemy: the Red Blok. The various colonies that still supported Ava were immediately granted full federal status and representation, as well as having the debt cancelled. This did not, however, prevent fully half of the Avan nations (Frontline; the Local Collective of Ava) and colonies joining the Red Blok in protest. The UNA prides itself on its democracy, liberalism and UN values of prosperity and individualism ("Living in the UNA, where anyone can shine in the firmament of success. Be a star!"). It appears to support total free market capitalism, with a few nods towards workers rights to prevent the growth of Red Blok ideology. Its military forces echo its ideals: composed of volunteers the White Stars (the Avan military) prides itself on being the best ("Better is better!"). Using the best weaponry UN industry could provide, supported by combat striders and with the best trained soldiers in human space, the White Stars are a force to be reckoned with. The UNA is primarily based on the modern United Nations and 1950s America, deep in the Cold War but confident in its own ideals.

The Therians 
Therians are a hostile invading race of post-singularity humanoids who use skeletal, cybernetic troops designed with spider-like design nuances. They are extremely long lived and view themselves as a form of what they call "hyperlife" and consequently other thinking beings are considered to be irrelevant, atavistic, ephemeral, and trapped at a stage of development that they long ago transcended. This arrogance leaves them with few scruples regarding the exploitation and destruction of other forms of intelligent life. They possess almost unlimited numbers and astounding levels of technology including highly developed nanotech and information systems that allow them to reshape their habitat spaces in any way they can imagine it. The Therians are obsessed with the immortality of their species and so have embarked on a remarkable and horrific plan to restructure the entire universe into a static and therefore eternal system of dyson sphere habitats that suit their extravagant "living needs". The Therian armies are composed of terrifying machines: automated combat walkers and golems that are directed by the nanomachine host for a Therian overseer. With powerful weaponry and tactics courtesy of a millennia of PvP and PvE wars on the EMI Grid (the entertainment and discussion network that connects all Therians) they are a terrifying prospect on the battlefield. Particularly when they start nano-constructing new units! In the Therian Army Book it is revealed that the Therians are in fact the descendants of humanity and that Sol is the sun at the heart of Thera, the first habitat they constructed. It is also revealed that they created both the Karman apelike species and the Avan humanoid species from modified stores of DNA from Earth. The Therians 
Take influence from real life internet forums and online games, taken to the extreme in the EMI Grid.

The Red Blok 
The Red Blok is the ideological nemesis of the UNA. Just like its counterpart, the Red Blok is an interplanetary human entity that lays claim to large number of habitable worlds. Unlike the UNA, however, the Red Blok is instead motivated by Collectivist Ideals and by a desire to make all people equal. In its efforts to ensure that everyone has the same life opportunities and standard of living, safe from exploitation, the collectivist movement born out of the revolution on the mining world of Hades has constructed a massive state administration. From the DistriPop (Distribution of Population) Sub-collective that determines where each and every person in the Red Blok is best employed, to the Local Collectivs of the various cities and planets to the vast machineries of AgitProp (Agitation and Propaganda Collective) and Supra (the Supreme Collective that manages all others). Every aspect of life is managed and controlled to ensure happiness and efficiency for all. It is unclear whether this is truly successful, or instead just repressive and totalitarian just as it is unclear if the UNA is really as free and prosperous as it claims. The Red Blok, however, still boasts a large and impressive armed force to support its ideals. The ARC (Army of Revolutionary Collectives) boast large numbers of committed, if not talented, soldiers. Equipped with the functional weapons of collectivist industry, the hordes of the Revolutionary Forces are a significant threat. Especially if backed up by their heavily armed combat striders and battlesuits, which boast far thicker armour than any UNA equivalent. The Red Blok is inspired by 1940s–50s Soviet Russia, and various elements of dystopian totalitarian regimes (George Orwell's Nineteen Eighty-Four)

The Karmans 
Karmans are an alien simian (specifically, gorilla) race, once subservient to the Therians, their "creators" but now emerging as an independent force on their own. Originally intended as a project of the Therian race to strip planets of resources rapidly through the "seeding" of rapidly industrialising societies, the Karman experiment failed after the race came to "Enlightenment". After seeing the destruction their own evolutionary path was taking them, the Karman race entered a period of soul-searching meditation that birthed a new philosophy of Karma, from which they are named. In this philosophy, all a person's actions cause a reaction in the universe, which contributes to the life vibe or energy of said person. This "karma", either good or bad, will result in subsequent reactions in the universal balance (a bad action will result in cosmic retribution for example) or at rebirth and reincarnation. The wisest of Karman sages have progressed to a new understanding of time, able to predict the future and influence it by their actions in the past and in the present. They are even aware that they may be living in several simultaneous incarnations in any one period of time as they perceive it, a difficult concept to grasp. With their enlightenment, the Karmans realised that the path that their Therian masters were taking was one of destruction. The final straw was the genocide waged by the Therians against the race called the Krygs, which the Karmans were unwilling participants in. In the end, the Karman race decided it was time to march to war, to bring enlightenment to the galaxy and enforce peace. Karman warbands are composed of elite warriors encased in battlesuits, supported by fast moving skimmers that bring heavy fire on the enemy at breakneck speeds. Their tactics are fluid and ever evolving, strike fast and hard before melting away and repeating the same elsewhere, leaving their opponents exasperated and exhausted. The Karmans inspiration comes from Buddhist philosophy and the warrior monks of the East, combined with obvious references to Planet of the Apes.

The Cogs 

The Cogs are an industrial alien race. Their facial features resemble those of the Greys, and wear spindly armor similar to the Therians, though they appear twice the height of their Avan counterparts. They have been shown carrying quantum blades and a large, multi-shot missile launcher. Recently, they have been revealed to possess advanced genetic engineering technology and evolve through cloning, in addition to their lethal quantum weaponry and AFV technology. First contact (with Avan-humans) was with the Red Blok faction.

The O.N.I. 

The ONI Corporation is a massive intergalactic consortium of multiple businesses and industries that unscrupulously sells its services to the highest bidder. At the forefront of technology in many fields, particularly weapons and "medical research", ONI prides itself on providing the best at the lowest cost. With interests spread all across human space, and even slightly beyond, the ONI Corporation will willingly sell the services of its zombie hordes and elite mercenaries to the highest bidder and in furthering its own profit garnering interests. Rumours speak of a darker secret behind the corporation, that not only laid the basis for its current success but also its scientific triumphs in the field of zombification. The ONI Corporation is loosely based on dystopian mega-corporations, with the classic hunger for profit with accompanying low moral standards. This is accentuated by their use of undead soldiers, and weaponry developed from all other AT-43 races currently available.

References

AT-43 Website  "Therians". Accessed April 16, 2008.
AT-43 Website  "U.N.A". Accessed April 18, 2008.
Grant Hill "AT-43 Operation Damocles Review", Tabletop Gaming News, January 7, 2007. Accessed April 16, 2008.
Overseer-Bilesuck "Therian Review", AT-43 Official English Forum, December 16, 2007. Accessed April 16, 2008.
 
Zen13 "Way of the White Stars – A Guide to UNA", AT-43 Official English Forum, December 11, 2007. Accessed April 17, 2008.

External links
Official AT-43 English Website (offline)
Official English forum (offline)
AT-43 The Comic (offline)
AT-43 Wiki (offline)
AT-43 Addict (offline)
NEAT-43 (offline)
German forum (offline)
www.at-43.biz German fansite (offline archived)
www.orderofgamers.com rules and resources fansite

Miniature wargames
Fiction set in the 7th millennium or beyond